Raidah Waryad is a sub-district located in Dhi al-Sufal District, Ibb Governorate, Yemen. Raidah Waryad had a population of 12528 as of 2004.

References 

Sub-districts in Dhi As Sufal District